The House of Mavrocordatos (also Mavrocordato, Mavrokordatos, Mavrocordat, Mavrogordato or Maurogordato) is the name of a family of Phanariot Greeks originally from Chios, a branch of which was distinguished in the history of the Ottoman Empire, Wallachia, Moldavia, and modern Greece.

History 
The family, whose members given the title of Imperial Count by Leopold I in 1699 later became Hospodars of Wallachia and Moldavia, was founded by the late-Byzantine noble (and merchant) Nicholas Mavrocordatos (1522–1570) from the island of Chios. In 1875 the Mavrocordatoi were also recognized as Princes of the Russian Empire by the Emperor Alexander II of Russia.

Notable members 

 Alexandra Mavrokordatou (1605–1684), spouse of the founder, intellectual and salonnière, mother of Alexander Mavrocordatos (1636–1709)
 Alexander Mavrocordatos (1636–1709), son of the founder and of Alexandra Mavrokordatou, styled prince ("Serene Highness") in 1699 by Leopold I, Holy Roman Emperor
 Nicholas Mavrocordatos (1670–1730), Alexander's son, ruler of Wallachia (two times) and Moldavia (two times)
 Constantine Mavrocordatos (1711–1769), Nicholas' son, ruler of Moldavia (four times) and Wallachia (six times)
 Alexander I Mavrokordatos "Delibey", ruler of Moldavia (1782–1785)
 Alexander Mavrokordatos, Nicholas' son
 Nicholas Mavrokordatos, ban of Wallachia
 Alexandros Mavrokordatos (1791–1865), Prime Minister of Greece (four times)
 John Mavrokordatos, Nicholas' son, ruler of Moldavia (1743–1747)
 Alexander II Mavrokordatos "Firaris", ruler of Moldavia (1785–1786)
 John Mavrocordatos (1684–1719), Alexander's son, ruler of Wallachia, caimacam of Moldavia

References

 
Romanian people of Greek descent
People from Chios
Greek noble families
Moldavian nobility
Phanariotes